P. Ranganath Shenoy was an Indian politician of Indian National Congress. He represented the Udupi (Lok Sabha constituency) in the fifth Lok Sabha

References

People from Udupi
India MPs 1971–1977
Indian National Congress politicians from Karnataka
Lok Sabha members from Karnataka